Andrew L. Krakouer (born 9 July 1971) is an Indigenous Australian former Australian rules footballer who played for North Melbourne in the Australian Football League.

He is the younger brother of Jim and Phil Krakouer and the uncle of Collingwood's Andrew J. Krakouer.

References

External links

WAFL Player Profile

1971 births
Living people
Australian rules footballers from Victoria (Australia)
Indigenous Australian players of Australian rules football
North Melbourne Football Club players
South Fremantle Football Club players
Sandringham Football Club players
Australian rules footballers from Western Australia